Wang Weiguang (born February 1950) is a Chinese politician who served as president of the University of Chinese Academy of Social Sciences from 2017 to 2018 and president of the Chinese Academy of Social Sciences from 2013 to 2018. He previously served as vice president of the academy and before that, vice president of the Central Party School of the Chinese Communist Party. He was a delegate to the 10th National People's Congress. He was a representative of the 19th National Congress of the Chinese Communist Party. He is a member of the 13th National Committee of the Chinese People's Political Consultative Conference.

He was an alternate member of the 17th Central Committee of the Chinese Communist Party and was a member of the 18th Central Committee of the Chinese Communist Party.

Biography
Wang was born in Dandong, Liaoning, in February 1950, while his ancestral home in Rushan, Shandong. Beginning in November 1967, he served in several posts in Heilongjiang Production and Construction Corps, including soldier, accountant, clerical officer, officer of the political department of a regiment, a company instructor, and a member of the party committee of a regiment.

After resuming the college entrance examination, in 1978, Wang entered Peking University, majoring in philosophy. After university in 1982, he was assigned to the Central Party School of the Chinese Communist Party, where he was promoted to associate professor in December 1987 and to full professor in July 1993. He moved up the ranks to become vice-president in February 1998.

He was appointed vice president of the Chinese Academy of Social Sciences in December 2007, becoming executive vice-president in July 2011 and dean and president in April 2013. He also served as president of the newly founded University of Chinese Academy of Social Sciences from May 2017 to March 2018.

In March 2018, he was made chairperson of the Ethnic and Religious Affairs Committee of the Chinese People's Political Consultative Conference.

Academic works

References

1950 births
Living people
People from Dandong
Peking University alumni
People's Republic of China politicians from Liaoning
Chinese Communist Party politicians from Liaoning
Alternate members of the 17th Central Committee of the Chinese Communist Party    
Members of the 18th Central Committee of the Chinese Communist Party
Delegates to the 10th National People's Congress
Members of the 13th Chinese People's Political Consultative Conference